Walton is a home rule-class city in Boone and Kenton counties in the U.S. state of Kentucky. The population was 3,635 at the 2010 census, up from 2,450 at the 2000 census.

History

Walton was established in 1840. The railroad was extended to Walton in 1869, prompting growth.

Geography
Walton is located in southeastern Boone County and extends slightly into southwestern Kenton County. U.S. Route 25 (Main Street) runs through the center of the city, and Interstates 75 and 71 diverge just west of the city limits. Access to the city from I-75 is via exit 171 (Kentucky Routes 14 and 16). Walton is the highest point between Cincinnati and Louisville.

Demographics

As of the census of 2000, there were 2,450 people, 913 households, and 665 families residing in the city. The racial makeup of the city was 97.35% White, 0.94% African American, 0.20% Native American, 0.69% Asian, 0.04% from other races, and 0.78% from two or more races. Hispanics or Latinos of any race were 0.73% of the population.

There were 913 households, out of which 41.3% had children under the age of 18 living with them, 54.3% were married couples living together, 14.6% had a female householder with no husband present, and 27.1% were non-families. 23.9% of all households were made up of individuals, and 9.1% had someone living alone who was 65 years of age or older. The average household size was 2.67 and the average family size was 3.15.

The age distribution was 29.7% under the age of 18, 8.9% from 18 to 24, 32.6% from 25 to 44, 17.5% from 45 to 64, and 11.3% who were 65 years of age or older. The median age was 33 years. For every 100 females, there were 90.4 males. For every 100 females age 18 and over, there were 84.9 males.

The median income for a household in the city was $42,462, and the median income for a family was $45,924. Males had a median income of $36,341 versus $24,858 for females. The per capita income for the city was $17,296. About 4.7% of families and 7.7% of the population were below the poverty line, including 9.1% of those under age 18 and 7.2% of those age 65 or over.

Arts and culture
Walton has held an annual "Old Fashion Day" every September since 1973 (the 175th birthday of Boone County). Waltonians decorate store windows with old-fashioned artifacts such as quilts, family heirlooms, and old photographs. Some residents dress in period costumes for a parade and a street fair with crafts, games, food, and live music.

Walton is the hometown of Steve Cauthen, the jockey who won the Triple Crown in 1978. The late pro wrestler Brian Pillman lived in Walton.

Parks and recreation
The City of Walton cooperates with the Boone County Parks Department to maintain the Walton Community Park. The park has soccer and softball fields, basketball courts, a paved hiking trail, shelters, picnic tables, multiple playgrounds, and volleyball courts. There is also access to nearby public golf courses.

Education

The city of Walton is part of the Walton-Verona Independent Schools. There is an elementary school in the neighboring community of Verona, and a high school and middle school within the city of Walton. The elementary school houses about 500 students, and serves preschool through fourth grade. The middle school serves grades five through eight and the high school teaches grades nine through twelve. One parochial elementary school exists in the city, St. Joseph Academy, with parochial high schools nearby. Six universities and ten colleges are within  of Walton, such as the Northern Kentucky University, Thomas More College, Indiana Wesleyan University,  and Gateway Community and Technical College.

Walton has a public library, a branch of the Boone County Public Library.

References

External links

 City of Walton official website
 Historical Images and Texts of Walton, Kentucky

Cities in Boone County, Kentucky
Cities in Kenton County, Kentucky
Cities in Kentucky
1840 establishments in Kentucky
Populated places established in 1840